Maurice of Savoy (10 January 1593 – 4 October 1657, Turin) was a Prince of Savoy and a 17th-century cardinal.

Life
He was the son of Charles Emmanuel I, Duke of Savoy and Infanta Catherine Michelle of Spain. Aged 14, in 1607, he became cardinal and bishop of Vercelli. In 1626, Maurizio founded in Rome the artistic and literary Accademia dei Desiosi, one of the most significant academies of the time. On 4 June 1627 he became the abbot of the monastery at Abondance and in 1637, on the death of his elder brother Victor Amadeus I, he and his brother Thomas claimed the regency of the duchy against Victor Amadeus's widow Christine Marie of France, but the king supported Christine and confirmed her as regent. In 1642 he left the clergy to become prince of Oneglia (1642) and marquis of Berzezio (1648). On 28 August 1642 he married his brother Victor Amadeus's daughter, Princess Luisa Christina of Savoy (1629-1692) in Turin.

It was Maurice who owned the future Villa della Regina and was an inhabitant of the future Palazzo Chiablese.

Ancestry

References

 

1593 births
1657 deaths
Princes of Savoy
Nobility from Turin
17th-century Italian cardinals
Burials at the Sacra di San Michele, Turin
Italian abbots
Bishops of Vercelli
17th-century Italian nobility
Clergy from Turin
Sons of monarchs